Docurama is an over-the-top video streaming service that serves documentary films to proprietary software clients.

The service was launched in May 2014 by US entertainment company Cinedigm. In 2013, Docurama had a library of about 1,200 programs, including feature-length films, short films, television programs, interviews, and film festival coverage.

References

External links 

 

Internet television channels
Video on demand services
2014 establishments in New York (state)
Cinedigm